Archive Series No. 1: Live in Iceland is a live album performed in Iceland on April 22, 2004 and released by Violent Femmes in 2006.

Track listing

Personnel 
 Gordon Gano – vocals, guitar
 Brian Ritchie – bass, shakuhachi, backing vocals
 Victor DeLorenzo – drums, percussion, backing vocals

The Horns of Dilemma 
 Matthias M.D. Hemstock – percussion
 Oskar Godjonnson – tenor saxophone
 Darren Brown – pocket trumpet
 Jarrod "Hollywood" Olman – alto saxophone

References

Violent Femmes live albums
2006 live albums